Owen Hayman (by 1508 – 1565 or later), of Dorchester, Dorset, was an English politician, barber and property owner.

He was a Member (MP) of the Parliament of England for Dorchester in April 1554.

References

Year of death missing
English MPs 1554
Members of the Parliament of England for Dorchester
Year of birth uncertain